Jovan Brkljač  (born 17 December 1993) is a Serbian football defender.

References

External links
 

1993 births
Living people
Sportspeople from Kraljevo
Serbian footballers
Association football defenders
FK Sloga Kraljevo players
FK Bane players
OFK Radnički Kovači players